Zachary Hemming (born 7 March 2000) is a professional footballer who plays as a goalkeeper for Scottish Premiership club Kilmarnock, on loan from EFL Championship  club Middlesbrough.

Early life
Born in Bishop Auckland, Hemming attended St John's Catholic School.

Career

Non league loans
Hemming joined Darlington F.C.
on a month's loan from Middlesbrough in October 2018, and made his debut in a 2-2 away draw at Bradford Park Avenue. He then kept a clean sheet in a 0-0 home draw with Guiseley. The following season he joined Hartlepool F.C. on loan but was recalled without making an appearance. In November 2019 he joined Blyth Spartans F.C. on loan, making his debut that month in the FA Trophy against Alfreton Town.

Promotion with Kilmarnock
Hemming joined Kilmarnock F.C. on a season-long loan in June 2021. He got off to a very good start, only conceding one goal in the first month of the season and being named Kilmarnock’s player of the month award for August 2021.
Hemming helped Kilmarnock achieve promotion as champions to the Scottish Premiership during the 2021-22 season. He kept 15 clean sheets in 36 appearances and was named Kilmarnock's Young Player of the Year. He was also was selected in the Scottish Championship’s goalkeeper in the Team of the Season. 

In June 2022 Hemming rejoined Kilmarnock on loan for the 2022-23 season.

Personal life
Hemming has two children, Riven and Louie with his partner Caitlin.

Honours
Kilmarnock
Scottish Championship: 2021–22

References

2000 births
Living people
Sportspeople from Bishop Auckland
English footballers
Association football goalkeepers
Kilmarnock F.C. players
Scottish Professional Football League players
Middlesbrough F.C. players
Darlington F.C. players
Hartlepool United F.C. players
Blyth Spartans A.F.C. players